Route 49 is a highway in eastern Missouri.  Its northern terminus is at Route 19 in Cherryville; is southern terminus is at U.S. Route 67 five miles (8 km) east of Williamsville.

The highway runs through the eastern part of the Ozarks and passes through two sections of the Mark Twain National Forest and near Johnson Shut-ins State Park and Taum Sauk Mountain.  Lesterville and Annapolis, as well as Johnson Shut-ins State Park, were evacuated in 2005 following a reservoir failure at the Taum Sauk pumped storage plant.

Route 49 is one of the original 1922 state highways.  It only ran between Glover and Piedmont and was later extended.

Route description

History

Major intersections

References

049
Transportation in Wayne County, Missouri
Transportation in Iron County, Missouri
Transportation in Reynolds County, Missouri
Transportation in Crawford County, Missouri